is one of the 24 wards of Osaka, Japan. It contains some shopping and entertainment areas, such as Tamade. It lies directly south of the Namba transport hub and extends further south toward Sumiyoshi Park. It is served by the Nankai Railway lines as well as the Yotsubashi and Sakaisuji subway lines. Nishinari-ku is also home to a number of shitamachi ("lower-town") shopping streets, increasingly a rarity in fast-developing urban Japan. Kamagasaki in Nishinari-ku is home to many day-laborers and most of the homeless people in Osaka.

Crime and safety 

Nishinari has a historical reputation for being "sketchy and dangerous", but it is currently undergoing gentrification.

Two designated yakuza groups, the Sakaume-gumi and the Azuma-gumi, are based in Nishinari.

Transport

West Japan Railway Company
Osaka Loop Line: Shin-Imamiya Station

Osaka Metro
Midōsuji Line: Dobutsuen-mae Station
Sakaisuji Line: Dobutsuen-mae Station, Tengachaya Station
Yotsubashi Line: Hanazonocho Station, Kishinosato Station, Tamade Station

Nankai Railway
Nankai Main Line: Shin-Imamiya Station, Tengachaya Station, Kishinosatotamade Station
Kōya Line: Shin-Imamiya Station, Haginochaya Station, Tengachaya Station, Kishinosatotamade Station
Shiomibashi Line: Kizugawa Station, Tsumori Station, Nishi-Tengachaya Station, Kishinosatotamade Station

Hankai Railway
Hankai Line: Minamikasumicho Station, Imaike Station, Imafune Station, Matsudacho Station, Kitatengachaya Station, Shotenzaka Station, Tenjinnomori Station, Higashitamade Station, Tsukanishi Station

Education
Public elementary and junior high schools are operated by the Osaka City Board of Education. The public high schools are operated by the Osaka Prefectural Board of Education.

Elementary schools
Imamiya Elementary School
Kishinosato Elementary School
Kitatsumori Elementary School
Koji Elementary School
Senbon Elementary School
Tachibana Elementary School
Tamade Elementary School
Tsumori Elementary School
Tengachaya Elementary School
Nagahashi Elementary School
Haginochaya Elementary School
Bainan Elementary School
Matsunomiya Elementary School
Minamitsumori Elementary School

Junior high schools
Imamiya Junior High School
Tsurumibashi Junior High School
Tengachaya Junior High School
Seinan Junior High School
Bainan Junior High School
Tamade Junior High School

High schools
Imamiya Technical High School
Nishinari High School

Notable people

Yoshie Kashiwabara, singer
Yashiki Takajin, singer and television personality
Kiichi Kunimoto, mixed martial artist

See also
 Kamagasaki, Day Laborers' District
 Tobita Shinchi, brothel district

References

External links

 Official website of Nishinari 

Wards of Osaka
Yakuza